Mauro Varela (1941 – 30 January 2020) was a Spanish banker, lawyer and politician who served as a Deputy (1989–2000) and as a member of the Parliament of Galicia.

References

1941 births
2020 deaths
Spanish politicians
Date of birth missing